The Ministry of Government may refer to:

Ministry of Government Administration, Reform and Church Affairs, Norway ministry responsible for reform work, information technology, competition policy
Ministry of Government and Consumer Services (Ontario), Ontario, Canada ministry responsible for the delivery and management of government operations
Ministry of Government Legislation, South Korea
Ministry of Government Services (Quebec), Quebec, Canada
Ministry of Government of Panama,  Panama